The Xi'an Satellite Monitor and Control Center (XSCC), also known as Base 26, is the primary satellite telemetry, tracking, and control facility of the People's Republic of China. Located in the Beilin District of Xi'an, Shaanxi Province, XSCC is subordinate to the Satellite Launch, Tracking, and Control Department of the People's Liberation Army Strategic Support Force (PLASSF).

History 
The history of the Xi'an Satellite Monitor and Control Center began in 1967 with the founding of the Satellite Ground Tracking Department in Qiaonan sub-district, Shaanxi on Jiuquan Satellite Launch Center (JSLC, Base 20). On 24 April 1970, when the People's Republic of China (PRC) launched its first artificial satellite, Dong Fang Hong 1, into orbit from JSLC, The Satellite Ground Tracking Department provided the "three grasps" (satellite tracking, telemetry, and control, TT&C) using the newly developed 7010 and Type 110 radars. Upgraded to a center in September 1975, as the PRC increased its testing of satellites, ICBMs, and SLBMs in the early 1980s and the TT&C network grew. The organization evolved into its current form in 1987, moving to Xi'an from Weinan.

By the 1980s, China's TT&C network consisted of two command and control (C2) centers: the Xi'an Satellite Control (XSCC) and Beijing Aerospace Flight Control Center (BACC), supported by six ground stations: Changchun, Lingshui, Kashgar, Nanning, Weinan, Xiamen, and a series of Yuan Wang-class tracking ships.

The facility was established in Weinan as the "Satellite Survey Department" in 1967, and relocated to Xi'an in 1987. Today, the XSCC comprises a mission control station in Xi'an and a set of tracking arrays located outside the city on a mountain plateau. The tracking station is equipped with antenna farms, masts, and communications dishes, while the mission control station is equipped with television screens, consoles, plotters, and high-speed computers that allow technicians to trace the orbital paths of all Chinese satellites in orbit.

Organization 
Xi'an Satellite Monitor and Control Center is composed of the following, subordinate ground stations:

 Changchun Station
 Kashgar Station
 Lingshui Station
 Menghai Station
 Minxi Station
 Nanning Station
 Qingdao Station
 Xiamen Station
 Weinan Station
 Xiangxi Station
 Zhanyi Station

The Changchun Satellite Tracking & Control Station, located outside of Changchun, Jilin Province, was established in 1968 and operates with the Military Unit Cover Designator (MUCD) Unit 63759. Outfitted with 154-IIB monopulse radar, may be a part of the Chinese Deep Space Network under the Jiamusi Satellite Tracking & Control Station.

The Kashgar Station, MUCD 63783, in the west of Xinjiang Autonomous Region was established in 1968 under Base 26 until Xi Jinping's 2016 military reforms when the organization was moved under the newly created PLASSF.

The Lingshui Control Station on Hainan was established in April 2008 and finds itself responsible for the tracking of Shijian satellites. A 40 meter radome was built in 2012.

See also
Beijing Aerospace Command and Control Center
Chinese Space Program

References

Further reading

Chinese space program facilities